In mathematics and in particular measure theory, a measurable function is a function between the underlying sets of two measurable spaces that preserves the structure of the spaces: the preimage of any measurable set is measurable. This is in direct analogy to the definition that a continuous function between topological spaces preserves the topological structure: the preimage of any open set is open. In real analysis, measurable functions are used in the definition of the Lebesgue integral. In probability theory, a measurable function on a probability space is known as a random variable.

Formal definition 

That is,  where  is the σ-algebra generated by f. If  is a measurable function, one writes

to emphasize the dependency on the -algebras  and

Term usage variations 

The choice of -algebras in the definition above is sometimes implicit and left up to the context. Some authors define measurable functions as exclusively real-valued ones with respect to the Borel algebra.

If the values of the function lie in an infinite-dimensional vector space, other non-equivalent definitions of measurability, such as weak measurability and Bochner measurability, exist.

Notable classes of measurable functions 

 Random variables are by definition measurable functions defined on probability spaces.
Continuous functions are Borel functions but not all Borel functions are continuous. However, a measurable function is nearly a continuous function; see Luzin's theorem. If a Borel function happens to be a section of a map  it is called a Borel section.
In the case   is Lebesgue measurable if and only if  is measurable for all  This is also equivalent to any of  being measurable for all  or the preimage of any open set being measurable. Continuous functions, monotone functions, step functions, semicontinuous functions, Riemann-integrable functions, and functions of bounded variation are all Lebesgue measurable. A function  is measurable if and only if the real and imaginary parts are measurable.

Properties of measurable functions 

 The sum and product of two complex-valued measurable functions are measurable. So is the quotient, so long as there is no division by zero.
 The (pointwise) supremum, infimum, limit superior, and limit inferior of a sequence (viz., countably many) of real-valued measurable functions are all measurable as well.
The pointwise limit of a sequence of measurable functions  is measurable, where  is a metric space (endowed with the Borel algebra). This is not true in general if  is non-metrizable. Note that the corresponding statement for continuous functions requires stronger conditions than pointwise convergence, such as uniform convergence.

Non-measurable functions 

Real-valued functions encountered in applications tend to be measurable; however, it is not difficult to prove the existence of non-measurable functions.  Such proofs rely on the axiom of choice in an essential way, in the sense that Zermelo–Fraenkel set theory without the axiom of choice does not prove the existence of such functions.

In any measure space  with a non-measurable set   one can construct a non-measurable indicator function: 

where  is equipped with the usual Borel algebra. This is a non-measurable function since the preimage of the measurable set  is the non-measurable   

See also 

 
 
  - Vector spaces of measurable functions: the  spaces

Notes

External links

 Measurable function at Encyclopedia of Mathematics
 Borel function at Encyclopedia of Mathematics

Measure theory
Types of functions